Daria Grigorievna Davydova (born 21 March 1991) is a Russian judoka. She won the silver medal in the women's 63 kg event at the 2021 European Judo Championships held in Lisbon, Portugal.

In 2019, she won one of the bronze medals in the women's 63 kg event at the Military World Games held in Wuhan, China.

In 2021, she competed in the women's 63 kg event at the 2020 Summer Olympics held in Tokyo, Japan where she was eliminated in her first match by Anriquelis Barrios of Venezuela.

References

External links
 

Living people
1991 births
Russian female judoka
People from Naberezhnye Chelny
Judoka at the 2019 European Games
European Games gold medalists for Russia
European Games medalists in judo
Judoka at the 2020 Summer Olympics
Olympic judoka of Russia
Sportspeople from Tatarstan
21st-century Russian women